The following list shows NCAA Division I football programs by winning percentage during the 1940–1949 football seasons. During World War II, numerous teams took seasons off and many military teams competed in the NCAA. During this time the NCAA did not have any formal divisions. The following list reflects the records according to the NCAA. This list takes into account results modified later due to NCAA action, such as vacated victories and forfeits.

 

 Chart notes

 Temporary military teams that competed in the NCAA during World War II.
 Teams took seasons off during World War II.
 Rutgers joined Division I in 1946.
 Pacific joined Division I for the 1943 season.
 Nevada joined Division I in 1946.
 Boston University joined Division I in 1947.
 Colorado College joined Division I during the 1943–1945 seasons.
 West Texas A&M joined Division I in 1941.
 Creighton dropped football after the 1942 season.
 Lafayette left Division I after the 1946 season.
 Wichita State joined Division I in 1945.
 Bradley joined Division I in 1949.
 Bucknell joined Division I during the 1944–1946 seasons.
 Washington (MO) left Division I after the 1942 season.
 Gonzaga dropped football after the 1941 season.
 Saint Louis dropped football after the 1949 season.
 Washburn left Division I after the 1940 season.
 Carnegie Mellon left Division I after the 1940 season.
 Manhattan dropped football after the 1942 season.
 Sewanee left Division I after the 1941 season.
 Presbyterian joined Division I for the 1944–1945 seasons.
 Mercer dropped football after the 1941 season.
 Centenary (LA) dropped football after the 1941 season.
 Portland joined Division I for the 1946–1947 seasons.

See also
 NCAA Division I FBS football win–loss records
 NCAA Division I football win–loss records in the 1930s
 NCAA Division I football win–loss records in the 1950s

References

Lists of college football team records